Sir Wilfrid Lawson, 3rd Baronet may refer to:

 Sir Wilfrid Lawson, 3rd Baronet, of Isell (1697–1737), MP for Boroughbridge 1718–1722 and Cockermouth
Sir Wilfrid Lawson, 3rd Baronet, of Brayton (1862–1937), Liberal Party politician and MP

See also 
Wilfrid Lawson (disambiguation)